Freuchen Land is a peninsula in far northwestern Greenland. It is a part of the Northeast Greenland National Park.

History
Freuchen Land was named after Arctic explorer Peter Freuchen (1886–1957), who took part in the 1906–1908 Denmark expedition and later in Knud Rasmussen's Thule expeditions.

Geography
Freuchen Land is located to the northeast of Nares Land, south of Sverdrup Island, and west of Nansen Land and the Hans Tausen Ice Cap. Its westernmost headland is Cape Wegener.

The peninsula is bounded to the west by the Nordenskiöld Fjord and to the east by the J.P. Koch Fjord. Navarana Fjord, a branch of J.P. Koch Fjord, cuts deeply southwards into the peninsula, nearly dividing it in two. This fjord was named after Peter Freuchen's Inuit wife, Navarana Mequpaluk (died 1921) 

To the southeast lie the Henson Gletscher and the Expedition Glacier which have their terminus at the J.P. Koch Fjord. To the south the peninsula is attached to the mainland and its ice cap.

Freuchen Land is mountainous and mostly glaciated in its high interior. Elevations reaching  are found in the central part of the peninsula.

See also
Cartographic expeditions to Greenland

References

External links 
Geographical and geological setting of the Henson Gletscher formation

Peninsulas of Greenland
Peary Land